Pi Delta Theta was a national collegiate sorority operating in the United States from February 14, 1926 until it was absorbed by Delta Sigma Epsilon in September 1941.

History
Prior to formation, the sorority had help in 1925 from the Sorority Service Bureau, whose Mrs. Ida Shaw Martin had been fielding requests for information from recently-formed local sororities seeking some manner of affiliation.  She invited representatives of three of these local organizations to send their faculty advisors to a meeting in Boston, Massachusetts in the summer of 1925. Two responded affirmatively, which constitute both the founders and founding chapters of Pi Delta Theta:
 Mrs. Robert E. Brown, Kappa Theta Alpha (local) of Miami University of Ohio
 Miss Beulah Houlton, Zeta Sigma Alpha (local) of Kansas State Teachers College, Emporia

The organization was thus formed, with the Miami chapter being named its Alpha chapter, and Mrs. Brown named as the first National President. Expansion began in earnest, but early chapters were lost as the Great Depression dragged on. In 1941, with WWII looming, the four remaining chapters opted for merger.

Pi Delta Theta was a member of the Association of Education Sororities, an NPC predecessor. The merger of Pi Delta Theta and Delta Sigma Epsilon was the only merger to occur within AES organizations.

Fifteen years later, in 1956 Delta Sigma Epsilon would itself merge with Delta Zeta.

Government
Government was vested in three entities: The national convention, the National Council and the Board of Advisers.

Symbols and traditions
 Colors were white, gold with myrtle green.
 The flower of Pi Delta Theta was the marguerite.
 The Sorority publications were the Thalia, which was published twice a year and the Myrsine which was published by the ex-collegio (alumnae) chapters four times a year.

Chapter List
The chapters of Pi Delta Theta were as follows. Chapters active at the time of the  merger are noted in bold, inactive chapters noted by italics :

References

Defunct fraternities and sororities
1926 establishments in Ohio
Delta Zeta
Student organizations established in 1926